Borys Shvets (born 20 August 1991) is a Ukrainian sailor. He and Pavlo Matsuyev placed 25th in the men's 470 event at the 2016 Summer Olympics.

References

1991 births
Living people
Ukrainian male sailors (sport)
Olympic sailors of Ukraine
Sailors at the 2016 Summer Olympics – 470